MGC50722, also known as uncharacterized protein LOC399693, is a protein that in humans is encoded by the MGC50722 gene (Mammalian Gene Collection Project Gene 50722). This 965 amino acid human protein has a molecular weight of 104.495 kDa and one domain of unknown function (DUF390). Generally conserved across mammals, this quickly evolving gene shows relatively low expression in most human tissues except in the testis.

Gene 
The entire human gene is 40,364 base pairs in length, while the unprocessed mRNA is 25,960 base pairs long. After splicing of introns the 10 exon gene has a final mRNA length of 3,596 base pairs that encodes for 965 amino acids.

Locus 
Human MGC50722 is located on the minus strand of chromosome 9 in the region q34 of the human genome (NCBI Gene ID:  399693). The most characterized gene in this region of the human genome is GPSM1, which encodes the G-protein-signaling modulator 1 protein.

Homology and evolution

Paralogs 
It was found that the centrosome-associated protein 350 (CEP350) was the only possible paralog to protein MGC50722 in humans. CEP350 is a 3117 amino acid long protein and aligns with protein MGC50722 at its N-terminus. This indicates the paralog spacing is very distant for when MGC50722 split from CEP350.

Orthologs 
Compete orthologs for protein MGC50722 are found only in mammals, where most conservation is found within the N-terminus and DUF390.

Distant homologs 
The most distant homolog detectable is in cartilaginous fish (462.5 MYA).

Homologous domains 
The domain of unknown function 390 (pfam04094: DUF390) is part of a family of proteins that have only been identified within the rice genome. Although this domain's function is unknown, it may be some kind of transposable element.

Protein

Primary sequence and isoforms  
Human protein MGC50722 is 104.495 kDa, with an isoelectric point of 10.24. A mixed charged cluster of amino acids is present between positions 146 and 182, which seems to be conserved in primates, but not present in other mammals. There are also 6 predicted isoforms found in human.

Subcellualar localization signals 
PSORTII servers  predict 5 nuclear localization signals in the human protein MGC50722. When ortholog sequences to the human protein were run through PSORT II, the predicted nuclear subcellular localization was a consensus prediction.

Post-translational modifications 
Human protein MGC50722 ortholog in mice, 4932418E24Rik protein, has experimentally determined phosphorylation sites at S588, S591, and S670 in the testis (pTestis ID: PT-MM-02686). Prediction servers at ExPASy also predict more phosphorylation sites (NetPhos 2.0 Server), a N-termnial acetylation site (NetAcet 1.0 Server), glycation sites (NetGlycate 1.0 Server), and a GalNAc O-glycosylation site (NetOGlyc 4.0 Server) at conserved residues in the human MGC50722 protein.

Secondary structure 
Prediction models characterized protein MGC50722 as mostly disordered, but two regions of coiled-coils.

Protein internal structure and features

Potential function  
The function of protein MGC50722 is unknown. Given that it is preferentially expressed in the testis and appears to be subcellularly localized in the nucleus, it could play an important role in gamete cells.

Interacting proteins 
Due to the recent identification of this gene and its protein, interaction databases (MINT, STRING, IntAct, and BioGRID) have not identified any interactions. More data would expand the characterization of MGC50722.

Expression 
Expression levels of human MGC50722 appear to low/absent in most cell types, with the highest and most abundant expression shown to be in the testis (GEO Profile IDs: 48997768 and 49895282). A lung cancer study also showed that MGC50722 was expressed in CD4+ T-Cells of normal human tissue samples.

Promoter 
The transcriptional start site for MGC50722 aligns best with SPZ1, SORY, SP1F, and FAST transcription factor binding sites.

Clinical significance 
A significant GEO Profile relating to MGC50722 was a study done on male fertility in humans looking at the disease teratozoospermia (GEO Profile ID: 38113951). Teratozoospermia is a condition where during the development of mature sperm cells morphology is altered, thus leading to, in some cases, male infertility. Gene expression shows that in normal human subjects MGC50722 is expressed, while in subjects with teratozoospermia expression levels drop significantly or shut off.

References

Suggested reading 

 
 
 
 

Uncharacterized proteins
Genes on human chromosome 9